Radical egalitarianism is a political theory associated with the ideas of optimistic tendencies, the suggestions that Americans must work in a multiracial society and that citizens must use activism to achieve the ultimate goal of satisfactory conditions for the entire population.

See also 
 Classless society
 Communism
 Egalitarianism
 Equality of outcome

References

Bibliography 
 Dawson, Michael C. Black. Visions: The Roots of Contemporary African-American Political Ideologies. 1st ed. Chicago. The University of Chicago Press. 2001. Print.

Egalitarianism
Far-left politics
Political philosophy